Frank French is an American rock drummer from Sacramento, California. He is a former member of the bands True West, Thin White Rope, the inversions, and Cake. He was the original drummer for Cake, departing from the band after the release of their debut album, Motorcade of Generosity.
He has played in several bands since then, and continues to live in Sacramento.

References 

Year of birth missing (living people)
American male singer-songwriters
American rock guitarists
American male guitarists
American rock singers
American rock songwriters
Cake (band) members
Living people
Singer-songwriters from California
Ragtime composers
Guitarists from California